Phryganidia chihuahua is a moth of the family Notodontidae. It is found in Mexico.

References

Moths described in 1987
Notodontidae